Journal of Veterinary Internal Medicine (JVIM) is a bi-monthly peer-reviewed scientific journal covering new scientific developments in veterinary internal medicine. It was established in 1987 and is published by John Wiley & Sons. It is the official publication of the American College of Veterinary Internal Medicine, the European College of Veterinary Internal Medicine, the European College of Veterinary Neurology, and the European College of Equine Internal Medicine.

History 
The journal was established in 1987 by the American College of Veterinary Internal Medicine with approval of the American Veterinary Medical Association. It was published as a bi-monthly, print journal until 2014, and became an open access journal as of January 1, 2015. According to the Journal Citation Reports, its 2020 impact factor is 3.333, ranking it 12 out of 146 journals in the category ‘Veterinary Sciences’.

References 

English-language journals
Veterinary medicine journals
Wiley-Blackwell academic journals
Academic journals associated with learned and professional societies
Publications established in 1987